The site of  in Hokuto, Hokkaidō, Japan, is the grounds once occupied by the castle or fortified residence of Yafurai. Recent excavations have unearthed ceramics and other finds that help locate the site within Muromachi-period long-distance trade networks.

Overview
Yafurai-date is situated on the Oshima Peninsula in the Yafurai area of what is now the city of Hokuto, near a small river a few hundred metres from the coast. Mobetsu-date, one of the so-called , also in the Yafurai area, lies a couple of kilometers to the south.

Excavation of one area of Yafurai-date in 1999–2000 unearthed a number of celadons, indicative of the elevated social status of its former occupants, and the site was hailed as the "Thirteenth Fort", the relationship with Mobetsu-date to be clarified by future excavation of that site. In 2010–2011, further excavation of Yafurai-date revealed earthworks, a palisade, two tombs, and a wealth of finds: Chinese and Japanese ceramics (including celadons, white porcelain, tenmoku tea bowls, Seto ware, Mino ware, and Echizen ware), a sword and sword-fittings, a tea kettle, an incense-burner, an iron pan, coins, a bell, lacquerware, and glass beads, helping date Yafurai-date to the mid-fifteenth to early-sixteenth centuries. An assemblage of one hundred and twenty-two artefacts (36 ceramics, 2 objects made of iron, 14 of bronze, 2 of stone, 66 coins, 1 glass bead, and 1 item of lacquerware) now at the Hokuto City Hometown Museum has been designated a Prefectural Tangible Cultural Property and attests to the connections between southwest Hokkaidō and the Sea of Japan coast during the Muromachi period.

See also
 List of Historic Sites of Japan (Hokkaidō)
 List of Cultural Properties of Japan - archaeological materials (Hokkaidō)
 Hokuto City Hometown Museum
 Hakodate City Museum
 Shinori-date

References

History of Hokkaido
Hokuto, Hokkaido
Archaeological sites in Japan
Castles in Hokkaido